Marvin Oduber (born March 12, 1976) is a Dutch financial advisor and entrepreneur based in Amsterdam.

Career
In 1996 Oduber started modelling in Aruba, and the next year he was signed by renowned Dutch modelling agency Touche Models  and appeared the following year on the cover of the agencies model book. Oduber studied business economics and in 2001 he founded an award-winning Financial Advice agency   in the Netherlands. Oduber is one of the co-founders of mortgage-tech company Elaine.

References

External links
 

1976 births
Living people
Dutch businesspeople
People from Enschede